Lycorea halia, the tropical milkweed butterfly (also known as tiger-mimic queen), is a species of nymphalid butterfly in the Danainae subfamily. It is found from Peru to the Caribbean and Mexico. Strays can be found as far north as Texas. The habitat consists of rainforest.

The wingspan is about 95–108 mm. Adults feed on bird droppings.

The larvae feed on Carica papaya, Ficus carica, Asclepias curassavica and Jacaratia.

Subspecies
 L. h. halia (Suriname, French Guiana)
 L. h. cleobaea  (Godart, 1819) (Antilles, Dominican Republic)
 L. h. atergatis Doubleday, [1847] (Mexico to Venezuela, Colombia)
 L. h. pales C. & R. Felder, 1862 (Peru, Brazil (Acre))
 L. h. demeter C. & R. Felder, 1865 (Cuba)
 L. h. cinnamomea Weymer, 1883 (Brazil (Amazonas))
 L. h. discreta Haensch, 1909 (Brazil (Minas Gerais, Rio de Janeiro, Bahia))
 L. h. fasciata Haensch, 1909 (Ecuador)
 L. h. transiens Riley, 1919 (Brazil (Amazonas))

Gallery

References

External links
Lycorea halia, Butterflies and Moths of North America

Danaini
Fauna of Brazil
Nymphalidae of South America
Butterflies described in 1816